Eisenmann (also transliterated Eisenman or Eiseman) is a German- or Yiddish-language surname from the German Eisen.  The name refers to one who works with iron. Notable people with the surname include:

Alvin Eisenman (1921–2013), American graphic designer
Charles Eisenmann (1850–1927), German/American photographer
 Doug Eisenman (born 1968), American tennis player
Eugene Eisenmann (1906–1981), Panamanian/American lawyer and ornithologist
Florence Eiseman (1899–1988), American children's clothing designer
I. Roberto Eisenmann Jr., a Panamanian journalist and founder and head of La Prensa, Panama's newspaper of record
Ike Eisenmann (born 1962), American actor, voice actor and producer
John Eiseman (1925–2016), American sprint canoer
Leatrice Eiseman (fl. 1998–), American colour specialist
Louis Eisenmann (1869–1937), a French historian and professor of Slavic studies
Nicole Eisenman (born 1965), American visual artist 
Peter Eisenman (born 1932), American architect
Robert Eisenman (born 1937), Professor of Middle East Religions and Archaeology
Thomas Eisenmann, Professor of Business Administration at Harvard Business School
Will Eisenmann (1906–1992), a German/Swiss composer

See also
 Eisenmann Medal, ornithological award
 Eisenmann Synagogue, Antwerp, Belgium
 Eisenmannia, synonym of Blainvillea
 Eizen, surname and given name
 
 

German-language surnames
Yiddish-language surnames